Ctenium elegans is an annual grass species in the genus Ctenium from African savanna areas. It is distributed from Senegal to the Sudan and grows on sandy soils of the South Sahelian and North Sudanian zones.

Uses 
The stems are used as materials for roof thatching and for making households products such as baskets, mats and brooms. Less known for use as grazing fodder.

References

External links 

 Herbarium Specimen at the Royal Botanic Gardens, Kew (through jstor)

Chloridoideae
Plants described in 1829